Fred Luddy (born ) is an American billionaire businessman, and the founder of ServiceNow, a cloud computing company.

Early life
Luddy grew up in New Castle, Indiana, the son of an accountant father and a Catholic-school teacher mother.

Luddy went to Indiana University, but dropped out, as he was spending too much time doing computer programming.

Career
In 2004, his then net worth of $35 million was lost due to an accounting fraud at his previous company, Peregrine Systems, of which he was the CTO.

Luddy founded ServiceNow two weeks before his 50th birthday, "I couldn't wait, because there was something psychologically that said I couldn't start a company at 50."

Luddy stepped down as CEO of ServiceNow in 2011, then focused on product development, and moved at an advisory role in 2016.

In April 2018, Luddy's net worth was estimated at $1.1 billion.

World Team Tennis
Luddy acquired a majority ownership of the San Diego Aviators in 2015. He currently serves of the Chairman of the Board of the team.

In 2017, Luddy was part of a purchase of World Team Tennis from Billie Jean King. He is now a majority owner with Eric Davidson.

Philanthropy
Luddy Hall at Indiana University was named in recognition of a donation from Luddy, and "in honor of the many IU alumni in the Luddy family, including Fred's mother, father, sister and two brothers".

References

1950s births
Living people
American company founders
Year of birth missing (living people)
Place of birth missing (living people)